Elnora  is a village in central Alberta, Canada that is north of Three Hills. It was first organized as a village on January 2, 1908 as "Stewartville" but was renamed to Elnora (for Elinor & Nora, the wives of the postmasters) when the opening of a post office the next year required a unique name.

Demographics 

In the 2016 Census of Population conducted by Statistics Canada, the Village of Elnora recorded a population of 298 living in 144 of its 160 total private dwellings, a  change from its 2011 population of 313.

See also 
List of communities in Alberta
List of villages in Alberta

References

External links 

1929 establishments in Alberta
Villages in Alberta